Lee County High School is one of four high schools in Sanford, North Carolina. The high school is located on 1708 Nash Street in Sanford and serves grades 9–12. The school mascot is the yellow jacket and the school's colors are Blue and Vegas Gold.

History
The school first opened under the name of Sanford Central High School in 1951. It was an all white school. In 1966 the school was integrated. In 1977, the school name was changed to "Lee County Senior High" and served grades 10–12. In the fall of 1992, Lee County Schools reorganized its grade configuration to elementary (K–5), middle school (6–8), and high school (9–12). For years Lee County High School was the only high school in Sanford/Lee County. As Lee County grew, Lee County High grew with population tipping to over 2,700 students, making it one of the largest high schools in North Carolina. It was decided to build a new high school. In November 2003, ground was broken on Tramway Road in Sanford and on August 25, 2005, Southern Lee High School opened its doors. It served grades 9–11 to start, with the Class of 2007 being the first class to graduate within the next school year.

Since the opening of Southern Lee High School, it has become a major rival in sports. Other major rivals are Western Harnett High School and Apex High School.

School information
The School operates on a 4×4 block schedule (90 minute classes/30 minute lunch). The School district is mainly northern/central Lee County from The Deep River area, to the Carolina Trace area. The school recently went under renovations, bringing its abundance of over 50 year old buildings up to the modern standard.

Sports
 Football
 Tennis
 Golf
 Basketball
 Baseball
 Softball
 Volleyball
 Cross Country
 Wrestling
 Gymnastics
 Cheerleading
 ROTC
 Swimming
 Soccer
 Track & Field
 Marching band

Notable alumni
 Britton Buchanan, singer-songwriter and musician
 Ryan Solle, professional soccer player
 Shareese Woods, American track and field athlete

See also
Southern Lee High School

External links
Lee County Schools website
Lee County High School website

Notes

Public high schools in North Carolina
Schools in Lee County, North Carolina